The men's half marathon event at the 2019 Summer Universiade was held on 13 July in Naples.

Results

Individual

Team

References

Half
2019